Willy Nilly Show is a New Zealand television series originally based on a short film by the same name. It follows the lives of two middle-aged farming brothers, Eric (Sean Duffy) and Harry (Mark Hadlow) who are catapulted into the modern world when their bossy and overprotective mother dies and Joy Full (Tandi Wright), the lovely undertaker's assistant, comes to stay. It is set in the fictional town of Pokapoka A total of 3 series were made which have all been made available on DVD at Filmshop. It was winner of Best Comedy Performance, Script and Direction - NZ TV Awards In 2002, a TV Guide poll found the series to be the most popular New Zealand comedy. The series' most prominent fan base is made up of women over the age of 60.

Episodes

Series One (2001)
 Under the Stinkwattle Tree
 Five Left Feet
 Down the Tube
 The Ram Who Knew Too Much
 In the Nudey
 The Ghost and the Dinner Party
 Spring Fever

Series Two (2002)
 The Vet (24 August 2002)
 Harrys Can Do Anything (31 August 2002)
 Are You My Daddy (7 September 2002)
 Birth and Death (14 September 2002)
 Through the Looking Grass (21 September 2002)
 Mum's Little Treasure (27 September 2002)
 Rain Rain Go Away (5 October 2002)

Series Three (2003)
 Twisted Sister
 Dr Harry's Casebook
 Pokapoka Pokerface
 Silage is Golden
 The Black Stump
 Don't Worry Be Harry
 St Eric of Pokapoka
 Just Another Day

Characters

 Eric - Sean Duffy 
 Harry - Mark Hadlow 
 Joy - Tandi Wright 
 Mr Bott - Stuart Devenie 
 Lubyanka - Ellie Smith (Series 2-3)
 Chantelle - Katrina Hobbs

DVD releases
All 3 series have been made available on DVD in New Zealand at Filmshop.

References

2000s New Zealand television series
2001 New Zealand television series debuts
2003 New Zealand television series endings
New Zealand television sitcoms
Television shows funded by NZ on Air
TVNZ 1 original programming